Vice-Admiral the Hon. Charles Orlando Bridgeman (5 February 1791 – 13 April 1860) was a Royal Navy officer who saw active service in the Napoleonic Wars and the Greek War of Independence.

Life

Bridgeman was a younger son of Orlando Bridgeman, 1st Earl of Bradford, by his marriage to Lucy Elizabeth Byng, daughter of George Byng, 4th Viscount Torrington and Lady Lucy Boyle, a daughter of John Boyle, 5th Earl of Cork. His siblings were: George Bridgeman, 2nd Earl of Bradford, Lady Lucy Whitmore, Hon. Orlando Henry Bridgeman, and Reverend Hon. Henry Edmund Bridgeman. He was educated at Harrow. On 18 June 1804, at the age of thirteen, he joined the navy as a first class volunteer on the almost-new HMS Repulse.

In 1805, Bridgeman was rated as a Midshipman, and during the Napoleonic Wars, he saw active service on blockade duty with Robert Calder, later serving in the Dardanelles Operation of 1807 and in the expedition to the Scheldt. In November 1809 he joined HMS Manilla under Captain George Francis Seymour, and on 10 September 1810 was promoted Lieutenant in HMS Semiramis. On 1 May 1811 he transferred to HMS Revenge as Flag-Lieutenant to Rear Admiral Arthur Kaye Legge and served at the defence of Cadiz. On 8 March 1813 he joined HMS Bellerophon and on 2 April 1814 the king's yacht HMS Royal Sovereign. He commanded HMS Badger from 12 December 1814 until 28 August 1816, on the West India station, taking part in the invasion of Guadeloupe of 1815. His next command was Icarus, a ten-gun brig-sloop, from 24 June 1817 until 2 September 1819, on the South America station. In 1819 he was promoted Captain. His last command, from 7 September 1827 to May 1830, was HMS Rattlesnake, attached to a squadron in the Mediterranean. For most of the years 1827 to 1829 Rattlesnake was cruising off the coasts of Greece during the Greek War of Independence. Her log for the period, kept by Talavera Vernon Anson, survives in a collection at the New York Public Library.

Bridgeman took retirement from the navy on 1 October 1846, joining the Reserved List on half-pay. He was later (10 September 1857) promoted to Vice-Admiral on the Retired List. In retirement he lived at Knockin Hall, Shropshire. When he died in April 1860 aged 69, he was still "of Knockin Hall" and left an estate worth about £16,000.

Marriage and descendants

On 2 January 1819 Bridgeman married Eliza Caroline Chamberlain, a daughter of Sir Henry Chamberlain, 1st Baronet. Their children were Edmund Wolryche Orlando Bridgeman (1825–1897), Caroline Elizabeth Anne Agnes Bridgeman (died 13 August 1914), Ursula Lucy Grace Bridgeman (died 13 November 1883), Charlotte Sobieski Isabel Bridgeman (died 13 June 1914) and Katherine Bridgeman.

Edmund Wolryche Orlando Bridgeman became a clergyman and in 1853 married Lilla Frances Richards. They had three daughters, Ursula Judith (born 1855), Maude (born 1857), and Dorothy (born 1861).

Caroline Elizabeth Anne Agnes Bridgeman married Sir Vincent Rowland Corbet, 3rd Baronet in 1854. Their children were Judith Elizabeth Corbet (died 1948) and Sir Walter Orlando Corbet, 4th Baronet (1856–1910).

Ursula Lucy Grace Bridgeman married firstly in 1847 Albert Denison, 1st Baron Londesborough, a younger son of Henry Conyngham, 1st Marquess Conyngham. In 1861 she married secondly Lord Otho FitzGerald, a younger son of Augustus FitzGerald, 3rd Duke of Leinster. Her children were Captain Henry Charles Denison (1849–1936), Commander Conyngham Albert Denison (1851–1938), Harold Albert Denison (1856–1948), Evelyn Albert Denison (1859–1933), Major Lord Gerald Otho FitzGerald (1862–1919), and Ina Blanche Georgie FitzGerald (1864–1910).

Charlotte Sobieski Isabel Bridgeman married Leopold Cust, son of Edward Cust, in 1863, and in 1876 her father-in-law was created a Baronet. In 1878 her husband succeeded him as second Baronet. She was appointed as a Lady of the Royal Order of Victoria and Albert. Her daughter Aleen Cust was the first woman to become a veterinary surgeon.

Notes

1791 births
1860 deaths
People educated at Harrow School
Royal Navy vice admirals
British naval commanders of the Napoleonic Wars
British military personnel of the Greek War of Independence
Younger sons of earls